Yes, Yes, Women Are My Weakness is a 1929 German silent comedy film directed by Edmund Heuberger and starring Georgia Lind, and Hans Albers.

The film's sets were designed by Gustav A. Knauer and Willy Schiller.

Cast

References

Bibliography

External links

1929 comedy films
German comedy films
1929 films
Films of the Weimar Republic
German silent feature films
Films directed by Edmund Heuberger
German black-and-white films
Silent comedy films
1920s German films
1920s German-language films